Cuyler is a surname that has several origins, such as Dutch for "victory of the people" or Gaelic for "chapel".  Kyler is an alternate spelling.

People with the surname
 Abraham Cuyler (1742–1810), American businessman and mayor of Albany
 Sir Charles Cuyler, 4th Baronet (1867–1919), English cricketer and British Army officer
 Cornelis Cuyler (1697–1765), American politician and mayor of Albany
 Cornelius Cuyler (1740–1819), American soldier and British Army officer
 Jacob Glen Cuyler (1773–1854), South African magistrate
 Jeremiah La Touche Cuyler (1768–1839), American attorney and judge
 Johannes Cuyler (1661–1740), American merchant and mayor of Albany
 Kiki Cuyler (1898–1950), American baseball player
 May Cuyler (1871–1958), American socialite
 Milt Cuyler (b. 1968), American baseball player
 Richard M. Cuyler (1900–1980), founder of South Kent School
 Theodore L. Cuyler (1822–1909), Presbyterian minister
 Thomas DeWitt Cuyler (1854–1922), American railroad executive

Fictional characters
 Cuyler family, the main characters of the Adult Swim animated comedy Squidbillies

People with the given name
 Cuyler Hastings (–1914) American stage actor

Places
South Africa
 Cuylerville, Eastern Cape

United States
 Cuyler, New York
 Cuylerville, New York

See also 
 Cuyler baronets
 Cuyler Presbyterian Church, Brooklyn
 USS R. R. Cuyler (1860), a steamship built in 1860